The following is an alphabetical list of articles related to the U.S. state of Louisiana.

0–9 

.la.us – Internet second-level domain for the state of Louisiana

A
Adams-Onís Treaty of 1819
Adjacent states:

Agriculture in Louisiana
Airports in Louisiana
Amusement parks in Louisiana
Aquaria in Louisiana
commons:Category:Aquaria in Louisiana
Arboreta in Louisiana
commons:Category:Arboreta in Louisiana
Archaeology of Louisiana
:Category:Archaeological sites in Louisiana
commons:Category:Archaeological sites in Louisiana
Architecture of Louisiana
Art museums and galleries in Louisiana
commons:Category:Art museums and galleries in Louisiana
Astronomical observatories in Louisiana
commons:Category:Astronomical observatories in Louisiana
Attorney General of the State of Louisiana

B
Baton Rouge, Louisiana, state capital 1849-1862 and since 1880
Pierre Belly
Black Belt
Botanical gardens in Louisiana
commons:Category:Botanical gardens in Louisiana
Bryan v. Kennett
Buildings and structures in Louisiana
commons:Category:Buildings and structures in Louisiana

C

Capital of the State of Louisiana
Capitol of the State of Louisiana
commons:Category:Louisiana State Capitol
Casinos in Louisiana
Census-designated places in Louisiana
Census statistical areas of Louisiana
Cities in Louisiana
commons:Category:Cities in Louisiana
Climate of Louisiana
Climate change in Louisiana 
Colleges and universities in Louisiana
commons:Category:Universities and colleges in Louisiana
Communications in Louisiana
commons:Category:Communications in Louisiana
Companies in Louisiana
Constitution of the State of Louisiana
Convention centers in Louisiana
commons:Category:Convention centers in Louisiana
Cuisine of Louisiana
commons:Category:Louisiana cuisine
Culture of Louisiana
:Category:Louisiana culture
commons:Category:Louisiana culture

D
Dave Robicheaux
Demographics of Louisiana
Donaldsonville, Louisiana, state capital 1830-1831

E
Economy of Louisiana
:Category:Economy of Louisiana
commons:Category:Economy of Louisiana
Education in Louisiana
:Category:Education in Louisiana
commons:Category:Education in Louisiana
Elections in the state of Louisiana
:Category:Louisiana elections
commons:Category:Louisiana elections
Environment of Louisiana
commons:Category:Environment of Louisiana
État de Louisiane

F
Fauna of Louisiana
Festivals in Louisiana
:Category:Festivals in Louisiana
commons:Category:Festivals in Louisiana
Flag of the state of Louisiana
la Florida, (1565–1702)
Forts in Louisiana
:Category:Forts in Louisiana
commons:Category:Forts in Louisiana

G

Geography of Louisiana
:Category:Geography of Louisiana
commons:Category:Geography of Louisiana
Ghost towns in Louisiana
:Category:Ghost towns in Louisiana
commons:Category:Ghost towns in Louisiana
Government of the state of Louisiana  website
:Category:Government of Louisiana
commons:Category:Government of Louisiana
Governor of the state of Louisiana
List of governors of Louisiana
Great Seal of the State of Louisiana

H
High schools of Louisiana
Higher education in Louisiana
Highway routes in Louisiana
Hiking trails in Louisiana
commons:Category:Hiking trails in Louisiana
History of Louisiana
Indigenous peoples
Spanish colony of la Florida, 1565–1763
Treaty of Paris of 1763
French colony of la Louisiane, 1699–1764
History of slavery in Louisiana, 1706–1865
Treaty of Fontainebleau of 1762
British Colony of West Florida, 1763–1783
Treaty of Paris of 1783
Spanish (though predominantly Francophone) district of Baja Louisiana, 1764–1803
Rebellion of 1768
Third Treaty of San Ildefonso of 1800
Spanish colony of Florida Occidental, 1783–1821
Republic of West Florida, 1810
French district of la Basse-Louisiane, 1803
Louisiana Purchase of 1803
Unorganized territory of the United States, 1803–1804
U.S. Territory of Orleans, 1804–1812
Sabine Free State, 1806–1821
U.S. unilaterally annexes Florida Parishes, 1810
State of Louisiana, since 1812
War of 1812, 1812–1815
Battle of New Orleans, 1815
Adams-Onis Treaty of 1819
Louisiana in the American Civil War, 1861–1865
Confederate States of America, 1861–1865
Louisiana in Reconstruction, 1865–1868
:Category:History of Louisiana
commons:Category:History of Louisiana
Hospitals in Louisiana
House of Representatives of the State of Louisiana
Hurricane Katrina

I
Images of Louisiana
commons:Category:Louisiana
Islands of Louisiana

J

K

L
LA – United States Postal Service postal code for the state of Louisiana
Lakes of Louisiana
commons:Category:Lakes of Louisiana
Landmarks in Louisiana
commons:Category:Landmarks in Louisiana
Languages of Louisiana
Laws of the state of Louisiana
Lieutenant Governor of the State of Louisiana
Lists related to the state of Louisiana:
List of airports in Louisiana
List of census statistical areas in Louisiana
List of cities in Louisiana
List of colleges and universities in Louisiana
List of festivals in Louisiana
List of forts in Louisiana
List of fossiliferous stratigraphic units in Louisiana
List of ghost towns in Louisiana
List of governors of Louisiana
List of high schools in Louisiana
List of highway routes in Louisiana
List of hospitals in Louisiana
List of individuals executed in Louisiana
List of islands of Louisiana
List of law enforcement agencies in Louisiana
List of museums in Louisiana
List of National Historic Landmarks in Louisiana
List of newspapers in Louisiana
List of parishes in Louisiana
List of people from Louisiana
List of radio stations in Louisiana
List of railroads in Louisiana
List of Registered Historic Places in Louisiana
List of rivers of Louisiana
List of school districts in Louisiana
List of sports teams in Louisiana
List of state forests in Louisiana
List of state parks in Louisiana
List of state prisons in Louisiana
List of symbols of the state of Louisiana
List of television stations in Louisiana
List of towns in Louisiana
List of United States congressional delegations from Louisiana
List of United States congressional districts in Louisiana
List of United States representatives from Louisiana
List of United States senators from Louisiana
Los Adaes, capital of the Spanish colony of Tejas
Louisiana  website
:Category:Louisiana
commons:Category:Louisiana
commons:Category:Maps of Louisiana
Louisiana Purchase of 1803
Louisiana Physician Consulting
Louisiana State Capitol
la Louisiane, 1702–1763

M
Maps of Louisiana
commons:Category:Maps of Louisiana
Mass media in Louisiana
Mississippi River
Monuments and memorials in Louisiana
commons:Category:Monuments and memorials in Louisiana
Mountains of Louisiana
commons:Category:Mountains of Louisiana
Museums in Louisiana
:Category:Museums in Louisiana
commons:Category:Museums in Louisiana
Music of Louisiana
:Category:Music of Louisiana
commons:Category:Music of Louisiana
:Category:Musical groups from Louisiana
:Category:Musicians from Louisiana

N
National Forests of Louisiana
commons:Category:National Forests of Louisiana
Natural history of Louisiana
commons:Category:Natural history of Louisiana
New Orleans, capital of Territory of Orleans 1803–1812, capital of State of Louisiana 1812–1830, 1831–1849, and 1865–1880
previously as Nueva Orleans, capital of Baja Louisiana 1763-1800
previously as la Nouvelle-Orléans, capital of la Louisiane 1722–1763, capital of la Basse-Louisiane 1800-1803
Newspapers of Louisiana

O
Opelousas, Louisiana, state capital 1862-1863

P

Paleontology in Louisiana
Parishes of the state of Louisiana
commons:Category:Parishes in Louisiana
People from Louisiana
:Category:People from Louisiana
commons:Category:People from Louisiana
:Category:People by city in Louisiana
:Category:People by parish in Louisiana
:Category:People from Louisiana by occupation
Politics of Louisiana
:Category:Politics of Louisiana
commons:Category:Politics of Louisiana
Portal:Louisiana
Protected areas of Louisiana
commons:Category:Protected areas of Louisiana

Q

R
Radio stations in Louisiana
Railroads in Louisiana
Registered historic places in Louisiana
commons:Category:Registered Historic Places in Louisiana
Religion in Louisiana
:Category:Religion in Louisiana
commons:Category:Religion in Louisiana
Rivers of Louisiana
commons:Category:Rivers of Louisiana
Roller coasters in Louisiana
commons:Category:Roller coasters in Louisiana

S
Sabine-Southwestern War
School districts of Louisiana
Scouting in Louisiana
Senate of the State of Louisiana
Settlements in Louisiana
Cities in Louisiana
Towns in Louisiana
Villages in Louisiana
Census Designated Places in Louisiana
Other unincorporated communities in Louisiana
List of ghost towns in Louisiana
Shreveport, Louisiana, state capital 1863-1865
Sports in Louisiana
List of sports teams in Louisiana
:Category:Sports in Louisiana
commons:Category:Sports in Louisiana
:Category:Sports venues in Louisiana
commons:Category:Sports venues in Louisiana
State Capitol of Louisiana
State of Louisiana  website
Constitution of the State of Louisiana
Government of the State of Louisiana
:Category:Government of Louisiana
commons:Category:Government of Louisiana
Executive branch of the government of the State of Louisiana
Governor of the State of Louisiana
Legislative branch of the government of the State of Louisiana
Legislature of the State of Louisiana
Senate of the State of Louisiana
House of Representatives of the State of Louisiana
Judicial branch of the government of the State of Louisiana
Supreme Court of the State of Louisiana
State parks of Louisiana
commons:Category:State parks of Louisiana
State prisons of Louisiana
Structures in Louisiana
commons:Category:Buildings and structures in Louisiana
Superfund sites in Louisiana
Supreme Court of the State of Louisiana
Symbols of the State of Louisiana
:Category:Symbols of Louisiana
commons:Category:Symbols of Louisiana

T
Telecommunications in Louisiana
commons:Category:Communications in Louisiana
Telephone area codes in Louisiana
Television shows set in Louisiana
Television stations in Louisiana
Territory of Louisiana
Theatres in Louisiana
commons:Category:Theatres in Louisiana
Tourism in Louisiana  website
commons:Category:Tourism in Louisiana
Towns in Louisiana
commons:Category:Cities in Louisiana
Transportation in Louisiana
:Category:Transportation in Louisiana
commons:Category:Transport in Louisiana

U
Unincorporated communities in Louisiana
United States of America
States of the United States of America
United States census statistical areas of Louisiana
United States congressional delegations from Louisiana
United States congressional districts in Louisiana
United States Court of Appeals for the Fifth Circuit
United States District Court for the Eastern District of Louisiana
United States District Court for the Middle District of Louisiana
United States District Court for the Western District of Louisiana
United States representatives from Louisiana
United States senators from Louisiana
Universities and colleges in Louisiana
commons:Category:Universities and colleges in Louisiana
US-LA – ISO 3166-2:US region code for the State of Louisiana

V
Villages in Louisiana

W
Wikimedia
Wikimedia Commons:Category:Louisiana
commons:Category:Maps of Louisiana
Wikinews:Category:Louisiana
Wikinews:Portal:Louisiana
Wikipedia Category:Louisiana
Wikipedia Portal:Louisiana
Wikipedia:WikiProject Louisiana
:Category:WikiProject Louisiana articles
:Category:WikiProject Louisiana members

X

Y

Z
Zoos in Louisiana
commons:Category:Zoos in Louisiana

See also

Topic overview:
Louisiana
Outline of Louisiana

Louisiana
 
Louisiana